Edith Jacqueline Ingram (16 January 1942 - 5 June 2020) was an American judge. She became the first African American woman judge in the United States in 1969. Ingram served on Hancock County Court of the Ordinary for 36 years. She moved to Hancock County's probate court in 1973, making her the first African American woman probate judge in the United States. Her service to the courts resulted in recognition from the Georgia General Assembly. Before becoming a judge, she taught at Georgia schools.

Early life 
Born in 1942, Edith Ingram lived in Sparta, Georgia with her parents, Robert T. Ingram and Katherine Hunt Ingram, and two brothers, Jerold O. Ingram and Robert L. Ingram. She attended East End Elementary School and later graduated from L.S. Ingraham High School. After high school, Ingram attended The City College of New York to pursue a nursing degree. Ingram lived in New York for a brief time before returning to Georgia in 1960. She graduated from Fort Valley State College (FVSU) in 1963 with a Bachelor of Science in education.

Career 
Ingram worked as an elementary and high school educator in Griffin, Georgia and Sparta, Georgia before pursuing law in 1968. In 1973, she moved to Hancock County's probate court, making her the first African American female probate judge in the United States. She was responsible for overseeing marriages, wills, and civil disobedience cases. During his term as the Governor of Georgia, President Jimmy Carter awarded Ingram the honorary title of Lieutenant Colonel aide-de-camp and appointed her to serve as a member of the State Democratic Executive Committee. She later worked for Joe Frank Harris as a part of the Georgia Governor's staff. The Georgia House of Representatives and Georgia Senate both passed resolutions in February 2000, honoring Ingram for her then 32 years of service for the Hancock County Probate Court.

Ingram continued to serve as a probate judge for Hancock County until 2004, when she retired after 36 years. She was honored in the collection Black Firsts: 4,000 Ground-Breaking and Pioneering Historical Events, which recognizes the achievements of African-Americans. She also has a scholarship named after her at FVSU.

Throughout her career, she was a member of multiple professional organizations including Delta Sigma Theta Sorority, the Hancock County NAACP, the Georgia Coalition of Black Women, and the Georgia Association of Probate Judges. As a member of the Georgia Coalition of Black Women, Ingram, along with others, supported increasing voter registration and ending poverty and drug use within African-American communities. Ingram also served as a board member of the Ebony International Learning Academy and Preparatory School.

Personal life and death 
Before her time as a judge, Ingram was an educator at Moore Elementary School in Griffin, Georgia and Hancock Central High School in Sparta, Georgia. Ingram was recruited by the Hancock County Democratic Club to run for public office. She was inspired to run for public office by her father, winning in 1968 and holding office for the next 36 years. On June 5, 2020, Edith Ingram died from natural causes at her home in Sparta, Georgia.

Citations

Works cited 

 
 
 
 
 
 
 
 
 

1942 births
2020 deaths
African-American judges
American women judges
Fort Valley State University alumni
Delta Sigma Theta members
20th-century African-American people
20th-century African-American women
21st-century African-American people
21st-century African-American women